Lycée International Georges Duby is a non fee-paying state high school in southern France, which prepares students for the French Baccalauréat. Students in the main section of the Lycée are drawn from the residential areas of the southern suburbs of Aix-en-Provence.

Location 
The Lycée is located on a sunny hillside in a village called Luynes, on the southern outskirts of Aix-en-Provence.

The surroundings are picturesque Provençal villages and residential areas dominated by Montagne Sainte-Victoire, a major landmark of the Aix area, and a favorite motif of Paul Cézanne. The school has the pleasure to be located in the countryside but within convenient distance of all major facilities.

The site for the school buildings was chosen to take full advantage of the benefits of the area both in terms of the quality of life and of its unique position between Aix-en-Provence and Marseille.

History 
The school is named after Georges Duby, an influential twentieth-century historian who taught at the University of Aix-en-Provence.

Specializations 
The Lycée provides three years of French secondary education to students ages 15 to 18.

The first-year students are typically 15 or 16 and are called Secondes, the equivalent of the American term Sophomores. During this year the students take the same general courses.

The second-year students are 16 to 17 and are called Premieres, or Juniors. After the first year, students are expected to choose three different spécialité, three academic specializations similar to “majors” at an American university. During this year the students take courses in their spécialité, such as :

 History geography, geopolitics, and political science 
 Math  
 Physics and chemistry  
 Economic and social science  
 Biology  
 History of arts  
 Humanities and philosophy  
 English literature

They can also choose a technical série, including sciences et technologies de la gestion (STMG) – Management Sciences and Technologies.

The third-year students are 17 or 18 and are called Terminales, or Seniors.  They are required to drop one of their three speciality courses and keep two instead.

If a student desires to pursue professional, post–baccalauréat studies at the lycée, he or she can apply for a two-year course entitled the Brevet de technicien suppérieur (BTS). It is a professional education in international trade and business, training students through a combination of coursework, internships in companies, and other training periods. Students who complete the program are prepared to be professional international businesspeople.

International Sections 
The lycée has two international sections, the English Section and the French-German Section.

The English Section 

The English Section plays an important role in the lycée. There are upwards of 350 students in the section of whom one third are English speaking (Anglophones). Students in the section follow mainstream courses in common with the students in the rest of the lycée, but they spend 10 hours per week in specific classes designed to cater for the international objectives of the students and to fulfil the aims of the school. Students in this section can take the OIB, L'option internationale du baccalauréat, for an international addition to their diploma. There are normally 5 OIB classes per Grade which are consisted of normally 20-25 students. The head of the section is Sharon Miron-Hughes, with an association named AGESSIA that helps students with extra curricular activities like clubs and also with future educational opportunities.

The French-German Section 

This section is designed to deliver both the general French education and an additional German element simultaneously. The Franco-German curriculum begins in the Seconde year and lasts three years. At the end of the Terminale year, students take both the French Baccalauréat and the German Abitur qualifications.

External links 

 Official website of Lycée International Georges Duby
 Unofficial website of Lycée International Georges Duby

References 

International schools in France
Private schools in France
Lycées in Provence-Alpes-Côte d'Azur
Buildings and structures in Bouches-du-Rhône